Samuel de los Reyes Domínguez (born 15 February 1992), known as Samu, is a Spanish professional footballer who plays as a left-back.

Club career
Born in Seville, Andalusia, Samu was a product of hometown Sevilla FC's youth system, and made his senior debut in 2008 at the age of only 16, with the club's C team. He signed a professional contract in 2011, and was promoted to the reserves in the Segunda División B.

On 17 February 2013, Samu cut ties with Sevilla and joined Segunda División side CE Sabadell FC. He made his league debut seven days later, playing the full 90 minutes in a 1–0 away win against Xerez CD.

Samu signed a two-year deal with Córdoba CF on 31 May 2013. He appeared in 25 matches during the campaign, as the Blanquiverdes returned to La Liga after a 42-year absence.

On 21 August 2014, Samu agreed to a new two-year contract, being immediately loaned to second-tier CD Lugo in a season-long move. On 14 January of the following year, he moved to UE Llagostera of the same league also in a temporary deal.

On 12 August 2015, Samu returned to Llagostera in a one-year loan. He scored his only professional goal on 14 February 2016, opening the 2–0 home victory over Albacete Balompié as the campaign ended in relegation from division two.

On 9 February 2018, after seven months without a club, Samu signed a short-term deal with Swedish Allsvenskan's GIF Sundsvall. On 29 June, he returned to Spain and its second division after agreeing to a contract at UD Almería.

Samu spent the first half of the season nursing an ankle injury, and subsequently terminated his contract on 18 January 2019. Three days later, he joined Marbella FC in the third tier.

References

External links

1992 births
Living people
Spanish footballers
Footballers from Seville
Association football defenders
Segunda División players
Segunda División B players
Tercera División players
Sevilla FC C players
Sevilla Atlético players
CE Sabadell FC footballers
Córdoba CF players
CD Lugo players
UE Costa Brava players
UD Almería players
Marbella FC players
Allsvenskan players
GIF Sundsvall players
Spain youth international footballers
Spanish expatriate footballers
Expatriate footballers in Sweden
Spanish expatriate sportspeople in Sweden